Guy Lordinot (born 30 January 1944 in Sainte-Marie, Martinique) is a politician from Martinique who served in the French National Assembly from 1988-1993.

References 
 page on the French National Assembly website

1944 births
Living people
People from Sainte-Marie, Martinique
Martiniquais politicians
French people of Martiniquais descent
Socialist Party (France) politicians
Deputies of the 9th National Assembly of the French Fifth Republic